Extremoplusia is a genus of moths of the family Noctuidae.

Species
 Extremoplusia megaloba Hampson, 1912

References
 Extremoplusia at Markku Savela's Lepidoptera and Some Other Life Forms
 Natural History Museum Lepidoptera genus database

Plusiinae